Angry Asian Man is an Internet blog founded in 2001 by Phil Yu. The blog focuses on Asian American news, media, and politics. The Washington Post calls Angry Asian Man "a daily must-read for the media-savvy, socially conscious, pop-cultured Asian American." An accompanying podcast, entitled Sound and Fury: The Angry Asian Podcast, was launched in May 2012 and features interviews with Asian Americans.

Origins
Yu first began blogging with a personal website www.minsoolove.com in 2000. In April 2002, he registered for the URL www.angryasianman.com.

References 

Asian-American mass media
Asian-American issues
American news websites
Korean-American culture
Internet properties established in 2001
Liberalism in the United States